Members of the second National Assembly were elected on 26 July 1998.

Composition

List of members 
 Cambodian People's Party
 FUNCINPEC
 Sam Rainsy Party

Source: National Assembly of Cambodia (in Khmer)

Lists of political office-holders in Cambodia